The 1997–98 New Mexico Lobos men's basketball team represented the University of New Mexico as a member of the Western Athletic Conference. The Lobos were coached by head coach Dave Bliss and played their home games at the University Arena, also known as "The Pit", in Albuquerque, New Mexico. New Mexico finished 2nd in the WAC Mountain division regular season standings and lost to UNLV in the WAC Tournament championship game. The Lobos received an at-large bid to the NCAA tournament as No. 4 seed in the South region. After defeating Butler in the opening round, New Mexico was bounced in the round of 32 by Syracuse, 56–46, to finish with a 24–8 record (11–3 WAC).

Roster

Schedule and results

|-
!colspan=9 style=| Regular season

|-
!colspan=9 style=| WAC tournament

|-
!colspan=9 style=| NCAA tournament

Rankings

References

New Mexico Lobos men's basketball seasons
New Mexico
New Mexico
Lobos
Lobos